Stelios Parpas (born July 25, 1984, in Limassol) is a Cypriot defender who currently plays for Karmiotissa.

Career
He performed very well defensively in the season 2008/2009. He played in fewer games in 2009/2010.

Steaua Bucharest

He was loaned to Romanian side Steaua Bucharest in the second half of the 2009–2010 season. He played 13 games as a starting player but Steaua failed to win the championship and his loan was not extended. He returned to AEL Limassol the next season.

External links
 
 

1985 births
Living people
Cypriot footballers
Cypriot expatriate footballers
Cyprus international footballers
Cypriot First Division players
Liga I players
Aris Limassol FC players
AEL Limassol players
FC Steaua București players
Enosis Neon Paralimni FC players
Alki Oroklini players
Othellos Athienou F.C. players
ASIL Lysi players
Karmiotissa FC players
Expatriate footballers in Romania
Cypriot expatriate sportspeople in Romania
Association football defenders